Kalachi (Kalachi), previously Kalachevskiy, is a rural locality in Esil District of Akmola Region, Kazakhstan. In 2014, it was reported that almost a fifth of the population had been affected with a 'sleep syndrome'. In January 2015, reports said that over half of the village's population planned to move elsewhere. It was later determined that increased carbon monoxide levels from a nearby abandoned mine had caused oxygen levels in the town to fall.

References

Populated places in Akmola Region
Earth mysteries